Giorgio Duranti (1683 – 5 November 1768) was an Italian painter and cleric of the Baroque period, mainly active in Brescia, where he was born. An entry in Dandolo's study of the late Venetian Republic states a 1755 as year of death, and that many of his works were in the Royal Gallery of Turin, which was the nucleus of the Sabauda Gallery.

Duranti was also an abbot, count and knight. He studied sciences and music; he was known as an excellent player of the violoncello. He specialized in still life paintings of flowers. Many of those, he donated to the church of Palazzolo sull'Oglio who sold to the royal court of Spain. His brother Faustino (1606–1766), who became abbot after his brother's death, was also a painter specializing mainly in miniature portraits.

References

 
 

Religious leaders from Brescia
17th-century Italian painters
Italian male painters
18th-century Italian painters
Painters from Brescia
Italian Baroque painters
Italian still life painters
1683 births
1768 deaths
18th-century Italian male artists